Fizer is a surname. Notable people with the surname include:

 Marcus Fizer (born 1978), American former professional basketball player
 William H. Fizer (1861–1937), American trainer of Thoroughbred racehorses

See also
 Pfizer (disambiguation)